Truro Tregolls is an electoral division of Cornwall in the United Kingdom and returns one member to sit on Cornwall Council. The current Councillor is Loic Rich, an Independent.

Extent
The division covers the east of Truro including Penair and Truro schools.

Election results

2017 election

2013 election

2009 election

References

Electoral divisions of Cornwall Council
Politics of Truro